Lecanora is a genus of lichen commonly called rim lichens. Lichens in the genus Squamarina are also called rim lichens. Members of the genus have roughly circular fruiting discs (apothecia) with rims that have photosynthetic tissue similar to that of the nonfruiting part of the lichen body (thallus). Other lichens with apothecia having margins made of thallus-like tissue are called lecanorine.

Lecanora has a crustose thallus, trebouxoid photobiont, colourless ascospores and crystals in the amphitecium.

It is in the  family Lecanoraceae in the suborder Lecanorineae.

Species

Lecanora campestris (Schaer.) Hue 1888  
Lecanora conizaeoides Nyl. ex Cromb. 1885
Lecanora gangaleoides,  Nyl. 1872  
Lecanora grantii,  H. Magn. 1932  
Lecanora helicopis,  (Wahlenb. ex Ach.) Ach. 1814 
Lecanora mellea, W.A.Weber (1975)
Lecanora muralis, (Schreb.) Rabenh. (1845) 
Lecanora poliophaea,  (Wahlenb.) Ach. 1810  
Lecanora rupicola,  (L.) Zahlbr. 1928  
Lecanora straminea,  Wahlenb. ex Ach.  
Lecanora strobilina, (Spreng.) Kieff. 1895
Lecanora usneicola,  Etayo, 2006

Gallery

See also
List of Lecanora species
Traditional dyes of the Scottish Highlands

References

 
Lecanorales genera
Lichen genera
Taxa described in 1809
Taxa named by Erik Acharius